Gil Har-Gil (born 1953 in Tel Aviv, Israel), is an Israeli landscape architect.

Biography 
Gil graduated from  the Environmental Design Department at the Bezalel Academy of Arts and Design, Jerusalem, in 1979. Upon completing his  B.A studies Gil was employed as a planner at the Building and Construction Centre, Tel-Aviv. In 1983 Gil completed his M.L.A studies in Landscape Architecture at Cornell University, N.Y, USA. During his stay in the United States, Gil also engaged in landscape planning at the New York State Parks Authority, and served as an assistant professor at Kansas State University. In 1992 he received his Ph.D. in Town and Regional Planning, at Technion - Israel Institute of Technology, Haifa, Israel.

In 1988 Gil Har-Gil and Daphna Greenstein Co-founded their firm Greenstein • Har-Gil Landscape Architecture Ltd. The office is located on Mount Carmel, Haifa, and engages in a wide range of projects, mainly for the public sector, on a national, regional and local level. The firm participated in invited and open competitions in Israel and abroad and was awarded several first prizes and citations. The firm was awarded, among others, the Azrieli Prize for urban planning, for the design of rehabilitation of the German Colony, Haifa. The Tel-Aviv municipality Karavan Prize, for planning and design of the Hecht Park in Haifa.
Among Gil's professional works are urban design projects, infrastructure landscape restorations projects, Renewable Energy, heritage sites, nature and landscape projects, as well as urban and regional master plans.

Alongside his professional work, Gil dedicated substantial time to academic teaching of landscape architecture. In 2013 Gil was nominated Associate Professor at the faculty of Architecture and Town Building at the Technion - Israel Institute of Technology.
Gil served as a board member of the Architecture Heritage Research Center, as a council member of the Israeli Landscape Architectures Association, as the representative of Israel to the International Landscape Architects Association (IFLA) and as chairman of the Israeli Landscape Architects Association (2009-2012). Furthermore, Gil served as a referee in many professional architecture and landscape architecture competitions.

Projects

 Haifa, Hecht Park, a linear, urban park, near the sea (Karavan Prize)
 Haifa, Shikmona sea shore promenade
 Haifa, the German Colony, rehabilitation of an historic city quarter (Azrieli Prize)
 Haifa, Wizo square, an urban plaza for the Art & Design Academy, in the German Colony
 Haifa, Hadar Neighborhood, urban renewal, restoration of historic streets
 Tel-Aviv, "Green routes” for pedestrians and cyclists
 Zihkron Ya'acov, “Hamoshava Park”, a central town park
 Kiryat Bialik, "Gan Habanim", a central town park, at the heart of an old neighborhood
 Tel Dan Nature Reserve, landscape restoration and preservation
 Akko, Napoleon Hill, Archeological park
 Beit She'an valley, Springs Park, located along water streams
 Snir River, promenade along the river bed
 Taninim River, interdeciplinary master plan
 Alona, Ancient Water Park, above ancient Roman Underground water channels.
 Tel Hai, open-air museum of historical events
 Cross Israel Highway (6), landscape restoration and tunnel portal design of the northern road sections (30 km)
 Infrastructure National Projects, rails, tunnels, gas lines and wind energy
 Ashdod and Nazareth, Urban Master Plans
 Renewable Energy, Wind turbines and Hydroelectric storage

Awards
 Karavan Award of Gardens and Landscape Architecture, Tel Aviv-Jaffo municipality for planning “Park Hecht”, 2009
 Azrieli Prize for Urban Planning, Council for a Beautiful Israel, for planning the German Colony in Haifa, 2006
 "Realizer of a Beautiful Israel”, The Council for a Beautiful Israel, for designing the German Colony, Haifa, 2001
 Lifschitz Prize, Haifa Municipality, for an impressive connection of Haifa's central landscape assets, 1999
 A Certificate of Appreciation, The Israeli Architects Association, on the occasion of fifty years of Israeli Architecture, for “professional contribution in the field of Landscape Architecture”, 1998
 First Prize, Henry Ford Foundation, in the field of heritage and preservation, for the German Colony project in Haifa, 1998
 Certificate of Appreciation of Building and Construction Center, Building and Construction Center, for "ongoing contribution to increasing awareness of landscape", 1997
 First Prize, an invited competition, German Colony, Haifa Municipality, Israel Lands Administration and the Government Tourism Corporation, for designing Ben Gurion Blvd. in the, 1995
 A Certificate of Appreciation, Program of Community Development, Cooperative Extension, Cornell University, U.S.A, for outstanding contribution and support in developing educational programs, 1993

References
Notes

 Shachar Raz, Haifa: A park between the railway and the main road  on NRG site Ma'ariv, 3 November 2009
 Hagit Peleg-Rotem, Karavan Award of Gardens and Landscape Architecture for "Park Hecht" in Haifa, on the site Globes, October 12, 2009

External links
 Greenstein Har-Gil, Landscape architecture and environmental design 
 The Israeli Association of Landscape Architects
 Guided Tour With Gil Har-Gil, Guy Shachar's Site
 Hecht Park and Shikmona Nature Reserve

http://www.globes.co.il/news/article.aspx?did=1000504464

Israeli landscape architects
Cornell University College of Agriculture and Life Sciences alumni